Faisal Stadium is situated in Muzaffargarh, Pakistan. This is multi-purpose stadium. The stadium has basket ball court, cricket ground, squash court, wrestling ground, an auditorium and grass plot. This is biggest ground of city for sports and political events. The main ground is used for cricket, football and hockey matches as well as political events.

See also
 List of stadiums in Pakistan
 List of cricket grounds in Pakistan

References 

Muzaffargarh
Cricket grounds in Pakistan
Multi-purpose stadiums in Pakistan
Stadiums in Pakistan
Buildings and structures in Muzaffargarh